The Kōseikai ("Fairness Association") was a political party in Japan.

History
The party was established in December 1916 by 36 National Diet members as a merger of a group of independents and the remaining members of the Kōyū Club who had not joined the new Kenseikai when it was established in September. However, it was dissolved the following month in 1917, and several of its members were amongst the founders of the Ishinkai after the April 1917 elections.

References

Defunct political parties in Japan
Political parties established in 1916
1916 establishments in Japan
Political parties disestablished in 1917
1917 disestablishments in Japan